Travis Japan is a Japanese boy band managed by Johnny & Associates. Their name is a tribute to the American choreographer Travis Payne, who assisted in their 2012 group formation during the production of stage show PLAYZONE'12 SONG & DANC'N. PARTII. The group moved to Los Angeles, California in March 2022, to study English and train with local choreographers and vocal coaches.

History

2012–2017: Formation and member changes 
In February 2012, while watching a play, Yoshizawa, Nakamura, Abe, Miyachika, Kajiyama and other Johnny's Jr were called to the rehearsal room, where they met with Travis Payne. Nakada, Kawashima, Morita, and Shimekake, active at that time as Jr. A, and who were later called "Older Brothers", were also there. By then, Travis Japan was formed with the five members mentioned first, whom were later called the "Younger Brothers", but in July it was informed that the nine would act as Travis Japan in Playzone'12 Song & Danc'n。Partii.

By 2015, they would continue performing in Playzone, but they would also be chosen as back dancers for Masahiko Kondō, Arashi and Tackey & Tsubasa.

By 2016, the subgroups' relationship as one group had not deepened, and they had even thought of appearing as "Older Brothers" and "Younger Brothers" in "Johnny's Ginza 2016" in May 2016, but reconsidered after the possibility of losing their job after the end of Playzone. Shortly after that, Abe expressed his intention of leaving. By October 2016's performances, the group was made up of 8 members. It continued like that until January 2017's "JOHNNYS' ALL STARS IsLAND", where this time, Nakada was the one mentioning his desire to pursue his dream.

Without Abe and Nakada, Travis Japan had 7 members working during their performances in 2017. In September's "Johnny's You&Me IsLAND", Morita was absent, leaving the group with 6 members.
Information about the start of the Fuji Television variety show "Johnny's Jr.dex", as well as "Johnny's Happy New Year IsLAND" event in October lacked  Kajiyama's name, leaving the group with 5 members. After that, at the performance of "Odaiba Odoriba Saturday and Sunday Playground" on November 18, 2017, 7 people appeared, including Genta Matsuda and Kaito Matsukura, who were active as back dancers for Sexy Zone and the stage performance "Endless Shock". The performance was actually an audition for Matsuda and Matsukura to see if they would join the group. They later revealed that they were told that for them to join, they would have to appear with the other five. The seven-men group appeared in the December broadcast of "Johnny's Jr. dex".

2018–2022: Pre-debut activities 
In March 2018, on the "Johnny's web" official site, regular posts started on their blog. Official member colors were revealed in the "About" page.
On August 8, 2019, they opened an official Instagram page. By October 10, 2022, they accumulated 980,000 followers.

They became the first Johnny's act to perform with an overseas artist, when they participated as special guests at the "Austin Mahone Japan Tour 2019" on October 14 and 15, 2019.
In 2019 they performed at the sold-out "Tora-ja ~ NINJAPAN" planned and composed originally by Johnny Kitagawa and directed by Hideaki Takizawa. The performance lasted for 3 years.

The group held their first Johnny's Jr solo concert at "Summer Paradise 2020", on August 1–10, 2020. They also performed at Arashi's last concert before hiatus, "This is Arashi Live", on December 31, 2020.

"+81 Dance Studio" is the name of the YouTube channel opened on August 25, 2021, the first one for a Johnny's Jr. solo (group) act. Their performances there are of new dance versions of classic J&A artists songs. The first song dance-covered there was Arashi's "Love So Sweet". They were the only Jr. group to perform at "Johnny's Festival – Thank you 2021 Hello 2022" on December 30, 2021, after receiving an offer from Arashi's Jun Matsumoto, who produced the event, as back dancers for KinKi Kids.
On March 3, 2022, on an Instagram Live, members informed of their travel to Los Angeles, California to study. On March 28, 2022, they competed in the World of Dance Championship Series – Orange County 2022, earning third place in the team category and winning the Best Costume and Crowd Favorite categories. On July 13, 2022, they auditioned for America's Got Talent, qualifying for the live shows' semifinals on August 13. On July 19, 2022, Yoshizawa announced a temporary hiatus due to tendonitis, returning to activities after August 13.

2022–present: Debut and later activity 
On September 29, 2022, it was revealed that they would be signed to Capitol Records, a subsidiary of Universal Music, and would make their worldwide major debut with their first single on October 28, 2022, first debut at the firm in nearly 11 months since Naniwa Danshi. The group opened a new official website, Twitter and TikTok. A solo YouTube channel was also launched  On October 10, 2022, the name of their debut song was released. A teaser of "Just Dance!" was released on their YouTube channel.

Members 

Current members
  - Chaka 
  - Umi
  - Shime
  - Noel
  - Shizu
  - Genta
  - Machu

Former members

Discography

Singles

Original songs

Career highlights

Special events 
 YouTube FanFest 2021 (December 11, 2021) Online
 RISING JAPAN MUSICFEST (June 11–12, 2022) Silverlakes Sports Complex
 Anime Expo (July 2–4, 2022) Los Angeles Convention Center
 Nisei Week(August 14, 2022) Los Angeles
 UNIK Asia Festival (December 10, 2022) Central Harbourfront, Hong Kong

International TV programs 
 The Shonen Club (2012 - ) NHK BS Premium
 America's Got Talent (season 17) (July 12, 2022) NBC

Dance contests 
 World of Dance Championship Series Orange County 2022 (March 27, 2022) House of Blues Anaheim
 Prelude Las Vegas 2022 (May 28, 2022) Artemus W. Ham Concert Hall
 World of Dance Championship Week (July 29–31, 2022) The Source OC

Concerts and solo shows 
 Odaiba Odoriba Sat/Sun Asobiba (November 18–19, 2017) Odaiba Wangan Studio
 Johnnys' Jr. Festival 2018 (February 26, 2018) Yokohama Arena
 Summer Paradise 2018 (August 18–24, 2018) TOKYO DOME CITY HALL
 Travis Japan Concert 2019 〜Present〜 (March 26, 2019) Yokohama Arena
 Johnnys IsLAND Festival (May 25–26, 2019) Saitama Super Arena
 Summer Paradise 2019 (August 10–22, 2019) TOKYO DOME CITY HALL
 Austin Mahone Japan Tour 2019: Special Guest Opener (October 14–15, 2019) Yokohama Arena
 Summer Paradise 2020 (August 1–10, 2020)
 Travis Japan LIVE 2020 ENTER 1234567 (September 26–27, 2020) Yokohama Arena
 Travis Japan Live tour 2021 IMAGE NATION (March 22 - July 16, 2021) 12 City / 33 Venue National Tour

Stage 
 PLAYZONE'12 SONG & DANC'N。PARTII。(July 9 - August 10, 2012) Aoyama Theatre
 Live House Johnny's Ginza 2013 (May 20–21, 2013) Theatre Creation
 PLAYZONE'13 SONG & DANC'N。PARTIII。 (July 3 - August 10, 2013) Aoyama Theatre
 ANOTHER (September 4–28, 2013) Nissay Theatre。
 PLAYZONE→IN NISSAY (January 7–28, 2014) Nissay Theatre
 PLAYZONE 1986...2014★Thank You! 〜Aoyama Theatre★ (July 6 - August 9, 2014) Aoyama Theatre
 ★Farewell!〜Aoyama Theatre★PLAYZONE 30YEARS★1232 (January 6–22, 2015), Aoyama Theatre
 Johnny's Ginza 2016 (May 2–6, 2016), Theatre Creation
 ABC-Za 2016〜OH&YEAH!!〜 (October 5–27, 2016) Nissay Theatre
 JOHNNYS' ALL STARS IsLAND (December 3, 2016 - January 24, 2017, Tokyo Imperial Theatre
 Johnny's Ginza 2017 (May 6–10, 2017) Theatre Creation
 JOHNNYS' YOU&ME IsLAND（2017年9月6日 - 30日、帝国劇場）
 ABC-Za Johnny's Legend 2017 (October 7–28, 2017) Nissay Theatre
 JOHNNYS' Happy New Year IsLAND (January 1–27, 2018) Tokyo Imperial Theatre
 JOHNNYS' King & Prince IsLAND (December 6, 2018 - January 27, 2019) Tokyo Imperial Theatre
 TORA JA-NINJAPAN- (November 2–10, 2019) Sunshine Theatre / (November 15–24, 2019) Kyōto Shijō Minami-za / (November 26–27, 2019) Misonoza / (November 30, 2019) Ueno Gakuen Hall
 Johnny's World Happy LIVE with YOU (March 30, 2020) Tokyo Dome
 Johnny's World Happy LIVE with YOU Jr. Festival 〜Wash Your Hands〜 (August 26, 2020)
 TORA JA-NINJAPAN 2020 (October 10–27, 2020) Shinbashi Embujo
 TORA JA-NINJAPAN 2021 (October 6–28, 2021) Kyōto Shijō Minami-za / (November 3–27, 2021) Shinbashi Embujo / (December 1–8, 2021) Misonoza / (December 11–12, 2021) Hiroshima Bunka HBG Hall

References

External links
 Johnny's net > Johnnys' Jr. - Johnny & Associates Official Roster
 Travis Japan Profile - Johnny & Associates Official Content Portal
 
 
 

Japanese pop music groups
Japanese idol groups
Japanese boy bands
Japanese dance groups
Johnny & Associates
Musical groups established in 2012
Musical groups from Tokyo
2012 establishments in Japan
America's Got Talent contestants